How the West Was One is the debut album by the rap duo Cali Agents. It was released in 2000 via Nu Gruv Alliance and Ground Control. It contained production from Paul Nice, His-Panik, M-Boogie, Madlib, R'Kasha, Protest, Memo, 427 and Roddy Rod. The album did not make it to any Billboard charts, but a single titled "Good Life" made it to No. 36 on the Hot Rap Singles.

The Source listed the album as one of the top six independent records of 2000. The album has sold over 50,000 copies without any major distribution.

In May 2004, Rasco's Pockets Linted records re-released the album with bonus tracks.

Critical reception
The A.V. Club wrote: "How The West Was One is an endless battle-rap session that serves as little more than a thorough assertion of the duo's lyrical dominance. Thankfully, Rasco and Planet Asia are battle-rappers of the highest order, excelling in nearly every aspect of rapping other than lyrical diversity." Exclaim! thought that "the focus on slinging hard-hitting verbals means that the sum is ultimately less than its parts, preventing this fundamentally sound collaboration from being great." CMJ New Music Monthly stated that the duo "swims in uninspiring four-track production."

Track listing

Bonus tracks
on 2004 release

References

2000 debut albums
Cali Agents albums
Albums produced by Madlib